Yi Bingheogak (24 February 1759 — 3 March 1824) (floruit 1809), was a Korean writer.

Early life
She was born on 24 February 1759 into the Jeonju Yi clan (전주 이씨, 全州 李氏), when Yeongjo was in his 35th year of reign, to a family of scholars. Her father, Yi Chang-su, was a 13th great-grandson of King Sejong through his 12th great-grandfather, Prince Yeonghae. Her father was a gamsa (監司) who dealt with the administrative affairs of Pyongyang. Her mother was Lady Ryu of the Jinju Ryu clan, aunt of writer Ryu hui who was known for his work Muntong (文通). 

Yi married writer Seo Yu-bon at the age of 15 in 1773. Seo's family on his maternal side was part of the political faction Soron. It is recorded in Seo's work Jwasosaninmunjip (左蘇山人文集) that Yi's talent in poetry was at a level where the two could exchange Chinese poetry with each other. Life grew harder for Yi as a result of Seo's early retirement amidst political troubles, so she cultivated a tea garden to get out of poverty. Her work Gyuhap chongseo was written then. After Seo died in 1822, she wrote Jeomyeongsa (絶命詞), a poem about the end of life (in this case her husband's) for her husband. She did not comb her hair or wash her face and remained in her house. She died in 1824 at age 66, 2 years after Seo's death.

Works
She published the women's encyclopedia Gyuhap chongseo about household tasks in 1809. She was one of very few published women in Joseon-dynasty Korea, alongside poet Seo Yeongsuhap (1753–1823), and Confucian philosopher Im Yunjidang.

Family 
 Father - Yi Chang-su (이창수, 李昌洙)
 Mother - Lady Ryu of the Jinju Ryu clan (진주 류씨, 晉州 柳氏)
 Uncle - Ryu Han-gyu (류한규, 柳漢奎)
 Aunt - Yi Sajudang (사주당, 師朱堂), Lady Yi of the Jeonju Yi clan (전주 이씨)
 Cousin - Ryu Hui (류희, 柳僖) (1773 - 1837)
 Siblings 
 Older brother - Yi Byeong-jeong (이병정) (1742 - 1804)
 Husband - Seo Yu-bon (서유본, 徐有本) (1 March 1762 - 26 August 1822)
 Daughter - Lady Seo of the Daegu Seo clan (대구 서씨, 大丘 徐氏)
 Son-in-law - Yun Chi-dae (윤치대, 尹致大)

References

External links 

 Pae-yong Y: Women in Korean History 한국 역사 속의 여성들

Korean culture
Korean calligraphers
19th-century Korean women writers
Women calligraphers